This is a list of listed buildings in Gribskov Municipality

List

3120 Dronningmølle

3200 Helsinge

3210 Vejby

3220 Tisvildeleje

3230 Græsted

3250 Gilleleje

See also
 List of churches in Gribskov Municipality

References

External links

 Danish Agency of Culture